Alexandr Boyarchuk (June 21, 1931 – August 10, 2015) was a Russian physicist and astronomer.

Life 
In 1953, he graduated from Leningrad University. After graduation, he worked at the Crimean Astrophysical Observatory, which was under direction of the USSR Academy of Sciences at the time. Later, he was elected a corresponding member of the same organization, and worked as an academician there until 1987. From 1987 to 2003, he was the director of the Institute of Astronomy of the Russian Academy of Sciences. From 1991 to 1993, he was also President of the International Astronomical Union.

Scientific achievements 
Boyarchuk specialized in studying the physics of stars. He carried out numerous studies regarding the chemical composition of stars of various classes, in particular, he discovered an excess of helium in Beta Lyrae. Boyarchuk also studied the motion of stellar atmospheres, as well as the rotation of stars. He devoted a number of his works to non-stationary stars. He was the developer of a model of symbiotic stars. Based on this model, he obtained estimates of the mass, size, temperature and other characteristics of these objects. Together with E.R. Mustel, he proposed a model for the envelope of new stars. Under the leadership of Boyarchuk, the ultraviolet telescope Astron was created.

Death 
Boyarchuk died on August 10, 2015 at the age of 84 in Moscow.

References 

1931 births
2015 deaths
Russian physicists
Russian astronomers
People from Grozny
Soviet astrophysicists
Presidents of the International Astronomical Union